Pilipinas News, roughly translated as Philippine News, was the flagship Filipino language late night news program broadcast by TV5. The show premiere on February 20, 2012, replacing Aksyon JournalisMO. It was anchored by Paolo Bediones, Cherie Mercado, and Jove Francisco, and was simulcast on AksyonTV and on the radio through 92.3 News FM in Mega Manila. The program aired every Monday to Sundays from 11:00 pm. to 11:30 pm. The show concluded on July 18, 2014, and was replaced by Aksyon Tonite, which incidentally marked the return of "Aksyon"-brand late night newscast dating back to Aksyon JournalisMO.

Weekday Edition
On October 25, 2010, Cherie Mercado and Jove Francisco are the earliest anchors.
On February 21, 2011, Paolo Bediones, joins Mercado and Francisco replaced Martin Andanar.

Cancellation
On July 18, 2014, it was the finale episode and was replaced by the last of four editions of Aksyon Tonite, which aired on July 21.

Weekend Edition

Halili-Templo era
Pilipinas News Weekend aired every Saturdays and Sundays 11:45pm to 12:15am, anchored by Maricel Halili, she is also one of the earliest anchors since 2010 together with Atty. Mike Templo and Jove Francisco in the past Weekend Late-Night News Program called Aksyon Sabado/Linggo. In August 2012, due to budgeting issues, the news program was rebranded as “Pilipinas News Weekend” with Maricel Halili and Atty. Mike Templo as the news anchors, while Jove Francisco was moved up to the primetime news program.

Halili-Alampay era
October 2012, TV5's online news portal, Interaksyon's Editor-in-Chief, Roby Alampay joined Maricel Halili until February 2014 to add a more mass appeal.

Halili era
Maricel Halili is currently the earliest field reporter, and was the solo anchor in the said Weekend Late-Night News Program.

Final Anchors

Weekday Edition
Paolo Bediones (2012–2014)
Cherie Mercado (2012–2014)
Jove Francisco (2012–2014; WiFive Segment Host)
Lia Cruz (2012–2014; Aksyon Weather Segment Host)

Weekend Edition
Maricel Halili (2012–2014, was also a relief anchor for Mercado)

Segments
National Round-up
Wi-5
Juan Lakwatsero
Juan Way
Juan Serve
Hataw Juan

Former Anchors
Atty. Mike Templo (August 2010–October 2012)
Roby Alampay (October 2012–February 2014)
Amelyn Veloso (2012–2013, relief anchor by Mercado)
Martin Andanar (2013–2014, relief anchor by Bediones)

See also
Aksyon
Aksyon JournalisMO
News5
List of programs aired by TV5 (Philippine TV network)
List of programs aired by AksyonTV/5 Plus

External links 
 (under the user name JournalisMO)
 (under the user name tv5journalismo)

TV5 (Philippine TV network) news shows
Philippine television news shows
TV5 (Philippine TV network) original programming
2012 Philippine television series debuts
2014 Philippine television series endings
Filipino-language television shows